Sawi is a district (amphoe) in the central part of Chumphon province, southern Thailand.

Geography
Neighboring districts are (from the south clockwise) Thung Tako and Lang Suan of Chumphon Province, La-un and Kra Buri of Ranong province and Mueang Chumphon of Chumphon Province. To the east is the Gulf of Thailand.

History
The district dates back to Mueang Sawi, on the shore of the Sawi River. On 16 April 1897 a first district office was opened in village five of tambon Na Pho. After several relocations, the present office in village four of tambon Sawi was opened on 1 October 2001.

Administration
The district is divided into 11 sub-districts (tambons), which are further subdivided into 114 villages (mubans). Na Pho is a township (thesaban tambon) which covers parts of the same-named tambon. There are a further 10 tambon administrative organizations (TAO).

External links
amphoe.com

Districts of Chumphon province